The Mexican professional wrestling promotion Universal Wrestling Association, which existed from 1975 until 1995 held a series of supercards over the years, including their annual "UWA Anniversary Show" that they held from 1976 until 1994 in late January or early February each year. Since the UWA operated before the pay-per-view (PPV) technology became readily available in Mexico the shows were normally taped for television broadcast.

UWA Debut Show

The Universal Wrestling Association (UWA) held their debut show on January 26, 1975 featuring a mixture of wrestlers who had joined the UWA founders from Empresa Mexicana de Lucha Libre (EMLL) and wrestlers from the independent circuit. In the main event Aníbal successfully defended the NWA World Middleweight Championship against former champion René Guajardo. Aníbal had taken the Middleweight championship belt with him when he left EMLL, but since the UWA were not members of the National Wrestling Alliance (NWA) Aníbal was stripped of the title after making an unsanctioned defense at UWA's debut show. The show featured five matches in total, including a Best two out of three falls Six-man tag team match featuring one of the UWA founders, Ray Mendoza, teaming up with two up-and-coming wrestlers Mil Mascaras and El Solitario, both of whom would go on to have long distinguished careers. They faced the team of veteran Dory Dixon who had joined the UWA to attain one last run in the main event, teaming with North American wrestler Sunny War Cloud and the man who would later become synonymous with the UWA, El Canek. Mendoza, Máscaras and Solitario won the match in three falls. The undercard featured several other wrestlers who had been underutilized in EMLL but would go on to become famous for their work in the UWA: Rayo de Jalisco, Tinieblas, Dos Caras and Villano I.

UWA 6th Anniversary Show

The Universal Wrestling Association 6th Anniversary Show (El Sexto Aniversario de Universal Wrestling Association in Spanish) was a supercard promoted by the Universal Wrestling Association (UWA) to commemorate sixth anniversary of their debut in 1975 and was held on February 8, 1981.

UWA 7th Anniversary Show

The Universal Wrestling Association 7th Anniversary Show (El Séptimo Aniversario de Universal Wrestling Association in Spanish) was a supercard promoted by the Universal Wrestling Association (UWA) to commemorate seventh anniversary of their debut in 1975 and was held on February 14, 1982. The main event of the evening was a tag team match where UWA wrestler Perro Aguayo teamed up with Abdullah the Butcher, wrestling and defeating the Japanese team of Antonio Inoki and Tatsumi Fujinami, representing New Japan Pro-Wrestling, with whom the UWA had a long running working arrangement. The semi-main event saw El Canek successfully defend the UWA World Heavyweight Championship against Don Corleone. Also on the card Gran Hamada defeated Centurion Negro to win the UWA World Middleweight Championship. Wrestling legend and multiple time world champion Lou Thez served as the referee for both championship matches. In the opening match UWA's premiere rudo (bad guy) Trio, Los Misioneros de la Muerte (El Signo, Negro Navarro and El Texano) defeated NJPW representatives Kuniaki Kobayashi, Masa Saito and George Takano.

UWA 9th Anniversary Show

The Universal Wrestling Association 9th Anniversary Show (El Noveno Aniversario de Universal Wrestling Association in Spanish) was a supercard promoted by the Universal Wrestling Association (UWA) to commemorate seventh anniversary of their debut in 1975 and was held on January 29, 1984. The only confirmed match results found for the 9th Anniversary show was from the main event as El Canek defended the UWA World Heavyweight Championship against the French André the Giant in one of El Canek's most famous matches. El Canek successfully defended the championship, actually bodyslamming André the Giant during the match, a feat very few people have done through Andre's career.

UWA 14th Anniversary Show

The Universal Wrestling Association 14th Anniversary Show (El Decimocuarto Aniversario de Universal Wrestling Association in Spanish) was a supercard promoted by the Universal Wrestling Association (UWA) to commemorate seventh anniversary of their debut in 1975 and was held on January 29, 1989. This event, like all other Anniversary shows took place at El Toreo De Naucalpan bullfighting arena, the UWA's "home arena". The main event was a high profile UWA World Heavyweight Championship match where champion El Canek successfully defended against one of Consejo Mundial de Lucha Libre (CMLL)'s most popular heavyweights Konnan. The show also featured a young Japanese wrestler by the name of Yoshihiro Asai, a man who would later become known as Último Dragón, a name he adopted while wrestling in Mexico.

UWA 16th Anniversary Show

The Universal Wrestling Association 16th Anniversary Show (El Decimosexto Aniversario de Universal Wrestling Association in Spanish) was a supercard promoted by the Universal Wrestling Association (UWA) to commemorate seventh anniversary of their debut in 1975 and was held on January 27, 1991. This event, like all other Anniversary shows took place at El Toreo De Naucalpan bullfighting arena, the UWA's "home arena".
In the main event UWA's most popular wrestlers, Mil Mascaras, Dos Caras and El Canek, defeated a team called The Hawaiian Beasts, consisting of Samoans Fatu, Kokina (Later known as Yokozuna) and Nikozuna (also known as the Samoan Savage).

UWA 17th Anniversary Show

The Universal Wrestling Association 17th Anniversary Show (El Decimoséptimo Aniversario de Universal Wrestling Association in Spanish) was a supercard promoted by the Universal Wrestling Association (UWA) to commemorate seventh anniversary of their debut in 1975 and was held on January 26, 1992. This event, like all other Anniversary shows took place at El Toreo De Naucalpan bullfighting arena, the UWA's "home arena". The main event was a high profile WWF World Light Heavyweight Championship defense with champion Chris Benoit defeating UWA's top Mexican Light Heavyweight Villano III in a match that went over 42 minutes of non-stop action.

The fifth match of the night featured the rivalry between El Hijo del Santo and Negro Casas, a rivalry that would continue for years, even after both wrestlers joined Consejo Mundial de Lucha Libre (CMLL). On the night Hijo del Santo teamed up with Dos Caras and Gran Hamada to defeat Casas, El Canek and Fishman. The show also had appearances of Buffalo Allen, Kokina, better known as "Bad News" Brown and Yokozuna in the World Wrestling Federation (WWF). In the third match Villano I made his last anniversary show appearance as he teamed with his brothers Villano IV and Villano V to defeat Baby Face, Killer and Canadian Tiger.

UWA 18th Anniversary Show

The Universal Wrestling Association 18th Anniversary Show (El Decimoctavo Aniversario de Universal Wrestling Association in Spanish) was a supercard promoted by the Universal Wrestling Association (UWA) to commemorate seventh anniversary of their debut in 1975 and was held on January 31, 1993. This event, like all other Anniversary shows took place at El Toreo De Naucalpan bullfighting arena, the UWA's "home arena". In the main event Vampiro defeated El Canek to win the UWA World Heavyweight Championship. This ended Canek's 11th, of an eventual 15, title reign. In the semi-main event foreigners Crash the Terminator, Eddie Watts and Goliath el Gigante UWA's Mexican representatives Dos Caras and Los Cowboys (El Texano and Silver King). Further down the card Los Misioneros de la Muerte (El Signo, Negro Navarro and Black Power II) retained the UWA World Trios Championship when they wrestled to a time limit draw against challengers Dr. Wagner, Jr., Scorpio, Jr. and Shu el Guerrero.

UWA 19th Anniversary Show

The Universal Wrestling Association 19th Anniversary Show (El Decimonoveno Aniversario de Universal Wrestling Association in Spanish) was a supercard promoted by the Universal Wrestling Association (UWA) to commemorate seventh anniversary of their debut in 1975 and was held on January 30, 1994. This event, like all other Anniversary shows took place at El Toreo De Naucalpan bullfighting arena, the UWA's "home arena". The 19th Anniversary Show was the last anniversary show promoted by the UWA as it closed its doors in February, 1995, less than a month after its 20th anniversary. El Canek was the only wrestler who worked on the 19th anniversary show that also wrestled on the UWA's Debut show. Canek teamed up with Gran Hamada and Transformer in the main event, losing to the team of Yamato and Los Villanos (Villano III and Villano V, sons of UWA founder Ray Mendoza). In the semi-main event Karloff Lagarde, Jr. defeated Celestial to win the UWA World Welterweight Championship. The opening match was a rare appearance of Mini-Estrellas in the UWA as their popularity had only reemerged in the early 1990s, UWA brought in Fuercita Guerrera and teamed him up with Mini-Estrella legend Pequeño Goliath who defeated Pequeño Chucky and Micro Konnan.

References

Lucha libre
Sport in Mexico
Professional wrestling-related lists
Professional wrestling shows
Mexico sport-related lists